Strickland Ketel is a civil parish in the South Lakeland District of Cumbria, England. It contains 16 listed buildings that are recorded in the National Heritage List for England.  All the listed buildings are designated at Grade II, the lowest of the three grades, which is applied to "buildings of national importance and special interest".  The parish contains the villages of Burneside and Bowston, and is otherwise rural.  The listed buildings consist of farmhouses, farm buildings, a  country house and its folly gatehouse, smaller houses, a summer house, a bridge, a monument, and three milestones.


Buildings

References

Citations

Sources

Lists of listed buildings in Cumbria